Maulana Abdur Rashid (مولانا عبدالرشید) is a Pakistani Islamic scholar and politician who served as Senator from March 2006 to March 2012.

References

Year of birth missing (living people)
Living people
Members of the Senate of Pakistan
Khyber Pakhtunkhwa politicians
People from Bajaur District
Jamiat Ulema-e-Islam (F) politicians